The 2006 McNeese State Cowboys football team was an American football team that represented McNeese State University as a member of the Southland Conference (Southland) during the 2006 NCAA Division I FCS football season. In their seventh year under head coach Tommy Tate, the team compiled an overall record of 7–5, with a mark of 5–1 in conference play, and finished as Southland champion. The Cowboys advanced to the NCAA Division I Football Championship playoffs and lost to Montana in the first round.

After a 1–4 start to the season, Tate was fired as head coach and replaced with Matt Viator as interim head coach. After a 5–1 start as interim head coach, on November 13 Viator was named as permanent head coach of the Cowboys.

Schedule

References

McNeese State
McNeese Cowboys football seasons
Southland Conference football champion seasons
McNeese State Cowyboys football